Andrej Hatala (born February 26, 1997) is a Slovak professional ice hockey defenceman playing for HC Nové Zámky of the Slovak Extraliga.

Hatala began his career with his hometown team HK Dukla Trenčín and made his debut for the team during the 2013–14 season. He remained with the team until 2017 when he moved to MsHK Žilina. He played for the team for just a single season before joining HC Nové Zámky on June 17, 2018. On June 29, 2020, Hatala joined HKM Zvolen.

Hatala represented Slovakia in the 2015 IIHF World U18 Championships and the 2017 World Junior Ice Hockey Championships.

Career statistics

Regular season and playoffs

International

Awards and honors

References

External links

1997 births
Living people
Slovak ice hockey defencemen
Sportspeople from Trenčín
HK Dukla Trenčín players
MsHK Žilina players
HC Nové Zámky players
HKM Zvolen players